Derrick Nathan Campbell (born February 18, 1972) is a Canadian short track speed skater who competed in the 1994 Winter Olympics and in the 1998 Winter Olympics.

He was born in Cambridge, Ontario.

In 1994 he was a member of the Canadian relay team which finished fourth in the 5000 metre relay competition. In the 1000 m event he finished sixth and in the 500 m contest he finished eleventh. In the 1000 m contest Campbell was obstructed by the Briton Nicky Gooch, who was disqualified. Campbell got up and thought he finished the race, and was celebrating his bronze medal with a Canadian Broadcasting Corporation reporter live on television when he discovered he hadn't completed the race. He had miscounted and left the track one lap short of the finish line, and was classified as a non-finisher. This meant that Marc Gagnon was a surprise bronze medallist, even though he wasn't even in the A final. Gagnon was first place in the B final so he received the bronze medal.

Four years later he won the gold medal with the Canadian team in the 5000 metre relay competition.

He was also training Francois Hamelin.

External links
 

1972 births
Living people
Canadian male short track speed skaters
Olympic short track speed skaters of Canada
Olympic gold medalists for Canada
Olympic medalists in short track speed skating
Short track speed skaters at the 1994 Winter Olympics
Short track speed skaters at the 1998 Winter Olympics
Medalists at the 1998 Winter Olympics
20th-century Canadian people